The Canal Fire was a wildfire that burned Millard County in Utah in the United States. First reported on June 26, 2020, the fire burned  on public land, including Fishlake National Forest and land owned by the Bureau of Land Management. Started by a lightning strike, the fire was contained on June 27, only to escape containment on June 28 due to strong winds. The fire led to the mandatory evacuation of Fool Creek Peak and Leamington, Utah. It was contained on July 11, 2020.

Events

June
The Canal Fire was reported burning five miles north of Oak City, Utah in Fishlake National Forest on June 26, 2020 around 4 PM. Started by a lightning strike, the fire is fueled by dry conditions, high winds, pinyon-juniper, tall grass, and brush. The fire threatened structures and power lines in the area. The start of the Canal Fire made it the second fire to burn in Millard County, Utah, alongside the Antelope Fire. 

However, the next day, June 28, the fire escaped containment lines. The area of Fool Creek Peak and the community of Leamington, Utah were evacuated. An unknown number of structures and outbuildings were destroyed by the fire. Crews began creating fire lines around homes. Evacuation orders were lifted.

July

As of the evening of July 1, the fire has burned .  Earlier that day, crews built containment lines on the southwest side (west of Highway 125 and east of Lynndyl), the northwest flank (north of Leamington and the Sevier River), and the east flank (along the Sevier River). Crews continue to build containment lines on all sides, with crews finally moving into Fool Creek Canyon to begin containment in the rural, south part of the fire. The east flank remains the most active part of the fire. Oak Creek Canyon Road, the campground, Fool Creek Canyon Road and Leamington Pass were closed.

That day, crews successfully contained the southwestern flank of the fire.

Impact

The fire threatened structures and power lines in Fishlake National Forest and on Bureau of Land Management and state land. It also threatened homes and structures near Fool Creek Peak and Leamington. On June 28, both Fool Creek and Leamington were evacuated. Residents were allowed to return the following day. An unknown number of outbuildings and structures were destroyed.

The Canal Fire led to the closure of a wide swath of land in the Fillmore National Forest Fillmore Ranger District, including Leamington Pass, Oak Creek Canyon, Fool Creek Canyon, and numerous trails, forest roads and Oak Creek Canyon campground.

See also

2020 Utah wildfires

References

Fishlake National Forest
2020 Utah wildfires
Millard County, Utah